Apple Hong (born 31 October 1978) is a Singaporean actress and singer. She was a Mediacorp artiste from 1999 to 2011 but continues to film on TV and ad-hoc basis.

Career
Hong was first runner-up in the Malaysian edition of Star Search 1999 and moved to Singapore after being offered a contract by TCS (now MediaCorp). She was then known as the ‘Malaysian Shu Qi’ due to her slight resemblance to the Hong Kong actress. Several years later she moved to SPH MediaWorks but was transferred back to MediaCorp when both companies merged in 2005. She made her cinema debut in Jack Neo's 2005 film One More Chance, starring as Mark Lee's on-screen wife. Besides acting, Hong was also a prominent face on magazine covers, print ads and television commercials in both Singapore and Malaysia.

Hong released her debut music EP in Singapore and Malaysia which consisted of 8-tracks with various musical genres including acoustic easy-listening, piano-pop tunes and also fusion of Chinese and Irish-styled songs.

Hong left the entertainment industry in October 2011 as she opted not to renew her full-time contract. While she continued filming with MediaCorp on a per-project basis, she stated she had wanted to spend time managing the Kuala Lumpur branch of Xiao Bar Wang (owned by former fellow MediaCorp actor Jeff Wang) and planned to further her showbiz career in China.

Personal life
Hong was married to a Singaporean businessman on 10 October 2017. Hong took up Singapore citizenship on 18 December 2022.

Filmography

Awards and nominations

References

Living people
Singaporean television personalities
Singaporean television actresses
Malaysian people of Chinese descent
Singaporean people of Teochew descent
People from Kuala Lumpur
20th-century Singaporean actresses
21st-century Singaporean actresses
1977 births
Malaysian people of Teochew descent